Edwin Franko Goldman (January 1, 1878 – February 21, 1956) was an American composer and conductor. One of the most significant American band composers of the early 20th century, Goldman composed over 150 works, but is best known for his marches. He founded the renowned Goldman Band of New York City and the American Bandmasters Association. Goldman's works are characterized by their pleasant and catchy tunes, as well as their fine trios and solos. He also encouraged audiences to whistle/hum along to his marches. He wrote singing and whistling into the score of "On the Mall" (which vies with "Chimes of Liberty" as his two most-enduring marches).

Biography

Goldman was born January 1, 1878, in Louisville, Kentucky, the son of David Henry and Selma Franko Goldman. The family moved to Evansville, Indiana in 1879 and, finally, to Terre Haute, Indiana. His father died in Terre Haute on December 18, 1886, when Goldman was only eight years old, and the following year, Selma and her four children, Edwin, Mayer, Irma and Alfred, moved to New York City. Before her marriage, Goldman's mother was a professional pianist and part of the famous Franko Family, which made its debut at Steinway Hall in New York on September 17, 1869.

At the age of nine, Goldman studied cornet with George Wiegand at the Hebrew Orphan Asylum in New York City. In 1892, after winning a scholarship, he attended the National Conservatory of Music, where he studied music theory and played trumpet in the Conservatory orchestra. He also studied under master cornetist Jules Levy.

In 1893 he became a professional trumpet player, performing in such organizations as the Metropolitan Opera House orchestra alongside his uncle Nahan Franko, the orchestra's concertmaster and assistant conductor. He married Adelaide Maibrunn (1885–1975) in 1908. The next year, he left the Metropolitan Opera orchestra and went to work for the publishing house Carl Fischer Music, where he remained for ten years.

Goldman founded the New York Military Band in 1911, later known as the famous Goldman Band. The band played in many summer band concerts throughout New York, especially The Green at Columbia University and then The Mall in Central Park. In the 1930s the band performed three nights a week at the bandstand in Brooklyn's Prospect Park. They were also heard on many radio broadcasts. A feature every concert was the encore, almost always Ravel's "Boléro" or Goldman's own march composition "On the Mall" accompanied by the audience singing the theme. From 1920 to 1926, Goldman moonlighted as the first professional "coach" of the bands at Columbia University, directing both the Columbia University Marching Band and the university's symphonic band.

During their nearly 50 years of their marriage, Adelaide wrote lyrics for several of Goldman's more popular pieces (including "On the Mall").

Goldman was known for his very congenial personality and dedication to music. He was very close to city officials and earned three honorary doctorates. Eventually in 1929, he founded the American Bandmasters Association and served as Second Honorary Life President after John Philip Sousa.

Edwin Franko Goldman died at Montefiore Hospital in New York on February 21, 1956, and his son Richard Franko Goldman succeeded him as conductor of the Goldman Band. For his contribution to the radio industry, Goldman has a star on the Hollywood Walk of Fame at 6410 Hollywood Boulevard. The Goldman Band Shell in Allentown, Pennsylvania's West Park is also named in his honor. For over 100 years, the band shell has been the home to the Allentown Band, of which Goldman was the first guest conductor in 1927.

Goldman's works

In his lifetime, Goldman composed over 150 works, his most famous being:

 1922 Chimes of Liberty (revised by Goldman in 1937)
 1923 On the Mall
 1931 Boy Scouts of America
 1931 Onward-Upward
 1934 The Children's March
 1934 The Interlochen Bowl
 1936 Bugles and Drums
 1937 Jubilee March
 1943 The Bugler (For Leonard B. Smith)
 1949 Introduction and Tarentella (For James F. Burke)
 1953 March Illinois
 A Bit of Syncopation, character piece
 Cheerio
 Espanita for cornet solo and brass band
 Jupiter for cornet solo and brass band
 Kentucky
 On the Green, waltz intermezzo
 On the Hudson
 Scherzo Cornet/Euphonium Solo
 Springtime Fancies, waltz
 Star of the Evening, waltz-intermezzo
 Sunshine and Shadows, waltz
  "Pioneer March"
  "Bluejackets on Parade"
He was also the composer of many cornet solos and other short works for piano and orchestra.

References

External links

 Edwin Franko Goldman's page at Carl Fischer
 Edwin Franko Goldman Collection, Special Collections in Performing Arts at the University of Maryland
 Edwin Franko Goldman Autograph Collection, Bentley Historical Library at the University of Michigan
 Edwin Franko Goldman recordings at the Discography of American Historical Recordings.
 
 Edwin Franko Goldman speaking over WNYC in 1954 talking about his career
 Etude Magazine Interview with Edwin Franko Goldman

1878 births
1956 deaths
American bandleaders
American composers
American cornetists
American male composers
Jewish American composers
Jewish American musicians
March musicians
Musicians from Indiana
Musicians from Louisville, Kentucky
People from Terre Haute, Indiana
United States military musicians